Eckerty is an unincorporated community in Johnson Township, Crawford County, Indiana.

History
Eckerty was laid out in 1873 by Christopher Eckerty.

Geography

References

Unincorporated communities in Crawford County, Indiana
Unincorporated communities in Indiana